Scullin is a small town in the state of Oklahoma. It is located in Murray County and has an unknown population estimated to be less than 100.

History 
The community of Scullin has a very vague history, mostly due to its extremely low population. It was founded before 1895, and was (at the time) located in an Indian Territory. From 1906 to 1909, Scullin and the surrounding areas had a newspaper named the Scullin Advocate.

Geography 
The largest town in Murray County, Sulphur, Oklahoma, is just 7.5 miles east of Scullin.

References 

Towns in Murray County, Oklahoma